is a railway station in the city of Nikkō, Tochigi, Japan, operated by the Yagan Railway.

Lines
Nakamiyori-Onsen Station is served by the Yagan Railway Aizu Kinugawa Line and is located 16.8 rail kilometers from the opposing terminal at Shin-Fujiwara Station.

Station layout
The station has a single island platform on an embankment, connected to the station building by an underground passage. The station is unattended.

Adjacent stations

History
It was renamed to its present name in March 2006.

Surrounding area
 
Miyori Post Office
Nakamiyori Onsen Center

External links

Yagen Railway Station information 

Railway stations in Tochigi Prefecture
Railway stations in Japan opened in 1986
Nikkō, Tochigi